Viva is a 2015 Spanish-language Irish drama film, set in Cuba, directed by Paddy Breathnach and written by Mark O'Halloran. The film stars Héctor Medina as a young drag performer who, after reuniting with his estranged father, must come to terms with his sexuality. The film was selected as the Irish entry for the Best Foreign Language Film at the 88th Academy Awards. It made the December shortlist of nine films, but was not nominated.

Cast
Jorge Perugorría as Angel
Luis Alberto García as Mama
Héctor Medina as Jesus
Jorge Martinez as Celeste
Luis Manuel Alvarez as Cindy
Maikel “Renata” Machin Blanco as Pamela
Laura Alemán as Cecilia
Paula Ali as Nita
Luis Angel Batista as Don
Luis Daniel Ventura as Kali
Maikol Villa Puey as William
Oscar Ibarra as Javier
Libia Batista as Lazara
Tomas Cao as Nestor
Jorge Acosta as Lydia
Mark O'Halloran as Ray

See also
 List of submissions to the 88th Academy Awards for Best Foreign Language Film
 List of Irish submissions for the Academy Award for Best Foreign Language Film

References

External links
 
 

2015 films
2015 drama films
2015 LGBT-related films
2010s Spanish-language films
Irish drama films
Cuban drama films
Cuban LGBT-related films
Irish LGBT-related films
Transgender-related films
Films set in Havana
Films directed by Paddy Breathnach